Simeon I may refer to:

Simon I (High Priest) (310–291 or 300–270 BCE), in the Temple in Jerusalem
Simeon I, Caucasian Albanian Catholicos in 706–707
Simeon I of Bulgaria (864/865 – 927)
Simeon of Moscow, Simeon Ivanovich Gordyi (the Proud), (1316–1353), Prince of Moscow and Grand Prince of Vladimir
Simeon I of Yerevan, Catholicos of All Armenians in 1763–1780

See also
 Simon I (disambiguation)